"Not for Long" is a song by American hip hop recording artist B.o.B. It was released on October 14, 2014, as a standalone single. The song, which was produced by P-Lo and Mark Nilan, and written by Paris Jones. It features guest vocals from American R&B singer Trey Songz.

Music video
An official lyrics video for the song was released on October 13, 2014, through B.o.B's YouTube channel. On November 17, 2014, a behind-the-scenes clip was also posted on the channel, and the following day the music video of "Not for Long" directed by Jerome D., was released.

Track listing
 Digital single

Charts

References

2014 songs
2014 singles
B.o.B songs
Trey Songz songs
Songs written by B.o.B
Songs written by Eskeerdo
Songs written by Trey Songz
Songs written by PJ (singer)
Atlantic Records singles
Grand Hustle Records singles